Peru–Poland relations refers to the historical and bilateral relationship between Peru and Poland. Both nations are members of the United Nations.

History

Small amounts of Polish migrants emigrated to Peru who were promised land near the Ucayali River in the late 1800s. The most prominent Polish-Peruvian was Ernest Malinowski who is accredited for building the world's highest railway (Ferrocarril Central Andino) in the Peruvian Andes. He also fought for Peru in the Chincha Islands War against Spanish forces in 1866.

In 1921, Poland established an honorary consulate in Lima and in 1923 Peru opened an honorary consulate in Warsaw. In 1923, Peru and Poland officially established diplomatic relations. In 1967, Poland opened a Consulate-General in Lima. In 1969, the consulate-general was upgraded to an embassy. That same year, Peru opened its embassy in Warsaw.

In 1989, President Alan Garcia became the first Peruvian head of state to visit Poland. In 1998, Peruvian President Alberto Fujimori paid a visit to Poland. In 2002, Polish President Aleksander Kwaśniewski paid a visit to Peru, the first Polish head of state to do so. In 2007, former Polish President Lech Wałęsa paid a visit to Peru. In May 2008, Polish Prime Minister Donald Tusk paid an official visit to Peru.

In 2013, both nations celebrated 90 years of diplomatic relations.
The former President of Peru, Pedro Pablo Kuczynski, is of distant Polish descent.

High-level visits
High-level visits from Peru to Poland
 President Alan Garcia (1989)
 President Alberto Fujimori (1998)

High-level visits from Poland to Peru
 President Aleksander Kwaśniewski (2002)
 Prime Minister Donald Tusk (2008)

Bilateral Agreements
Both nations have signed several bilateral agreements such as an Agreement on Trade (1968); Agreement on Tourism (2008), Agreement on Scientific and Cultural Cooperation (2008) and an Agreement on the Transfer of Prisoners (2014). There are also cooperation agreements between some Peruvian and Polish universities.

Trade

In 2018, trade between Peru and Poland totaled US$201 million. Peruvian exports to Poland mainly consist of fruits and fish products. Polish exports to Peru include: electrical devices, motor vehicles, light bulbs, dairy products, petroleum oils, tractors, electrical wires and machines for the food industry.

Resident diplomatic missions
 Peru has an embassy in Warsaw.
 Poland has an embassy in Lima.

See also
 Foreign relations of Peru 
 Foreign relations of Poland
 Colonization attempts by Poland
 List of ambassadors of Peru to Poland

References

 
Poland
Bilateral relations of Poland